Óscar Luebbert Gutiérrez (born 24 December 1956) is a Mexican politician affiliated with the Institutional Revolutionary Party. As of 2000 he served as Senator of the LVIII and LIX Legislatures of the Mexican Congress representing Tamaulipas. He served twice as Mayor of Reynosa from 1996 to 1998, and his second term from 2008 to 2010.  He also served as Deputy during the LV Legislature.

References

1956 births
Living people
People from Reynosa
Members of the Senate of the Republic (Mexico)
Members of the Chamber of Deputies (Mexico) for Tamaulipas
Institutional Revolutionary Party politicians
21st-century Mexican politicians
Deputies of the LV Legislature of Mexico